Takasu is a Hiroden station on Hiroden Miyajima Line, located in Takasu, Nishi-ku, Hiroshima.

Routes
From Takasu Station, there is one of Hiroden Streetcar routes.
 Hiroshima Station - Hiroden-miyajima-guchi Route

Connections
█ Miyajima Line

Higashi-takasu — Takasu — Furue

Around station

History
Opened on August 22, 1922.

See also
Hiroden Streetcar Lines and Routes

References 

Takasu Station
Railway stations in Japan opened in 1922